The following table displays, by color, the parties of elected officials in the U.S. state of Alabama from 1817 to the current year.
As such, it may indicate the political party strength at any given time. The officers listed include:
 Governor
 Lieutenant governor
 Secretary of State
 Attorney general
 Comptroller of Public Accounts/State Auditor
 State treasurer
 Commissioner of Agriculture and Industries

The table also indicates the historical party composition in the:
 State Senate
 State House of Representatives
 State delegation to the U.S. Senate
 State delegation to the U.S. House of Representatives

For years in which a presidential election was held, the table indicates which party's nominees received the state's electoral votes.

1817–1882

1883–present

References

Politics of Alabama
Alabama